John Fletcher Miller (May 27, 1890 – March 30, 1972) was an American football, basketball, and baseball coach and college athletics administrator.

Playing career
Miller played football, basketball, and baseball at Warrensburg Teachers College—now known as the University of Central Missouri.

Coaching career
Miller was the head football (1919), basketball (1916–1917, 1918–1919), and baseball (1918, 1920–1921) coach at the University of Missouri.

Miller was the head football coach at Albion College in Albion, Michigan.  He held that position for three seasons, from 1921 until 1923.  His coaching record at Albion was 18–6–2.

Athletic director
Miller served as the athletic director at North Carolina State University in Raleigh, North Carolina.

Death
Miller died on March 30, 1972, at Rex Hospital in Raleigh.

Head coaching record

Football

References

External links
 
 Guide to the John Fletcher Miller Papers 1924-1972

1890 births
1972 deaths
American men's basketball players
Albion Britons athletic directors
Albion Britons football coaches
Albion Britons men's basketball coaches
Central Missouri Mules baseball players
Central Missouri Mules basketball players
Central Missouri Mules football players
Missouri Tigers baseball coaches
Missouri Tigers football coaches
Missouri Tigers men's basketball coaches
NC State Wolfpack athletic directors
People from Warrensburg, Missouri
Coaches of American football from Missouri
Players of American football from Missouri
Baseball coaches from Missouri
Baseball players from Missouri
Basketball coaches from Missouri
Basketball players from Missouri